Knowle Hill Castle is an Iron Age hill fort situated close to Braunton in Devon, England. The fort is situated on a hillside forming a promontory above the River Caen at approx 90 metres above sea level to the north of the town, close to the village of Knowle.

References

Hill forts in Devon
Braunton